Varanus colei is a species of lizard of the Varanidae family. It is found on the  Kai Islands in Indonesia.

References

Varanus
Reptiles described in 2019
Reptiles of Indonesia